John Griffith (1622?–1700) was an English General Baptist minister.

Life
Griffiths appears to have joined the Baptists about 1640, and founded about 1646 a London congregation in Dunning's Alley, Bishopsgate Street Without. It is probable that he practised medicine, as he was known as Dr. Griffith.

After the Restoration of 1660, Griffith frequently got into trouble as a conventicle preacher; and persistently declined the oath of allegiance. His difficulty was that the terms of the oath bound him to obey laws not then in being, and future sovereigns who might be Roman Catholic. His first imprisonment was in Newgate Prison (1661) for 17 months. He was again committed on 18 April 1683, and is said to have spent fourteen years more or less in gaol.

Griffith was apparently free from molestation after James II's declaration for liberty of conscience (11 April 1687). In 1698 his small congregation received an endowment under a trust created by Captain Pierce Johns' bequest. He was an advocate of close communion. He died on 16 May 1700, in his seventy-ninth year.

Works
Griffith published:

A Voice from the Word of the Lord, to … Quakers, 1654.
Six Principles of the Christian Religion, 1655.
Gods Oracle & Christs Doctrine, 1655, reply to Questions about Laying on of Hands (1655) by Edmund Chillenden, Henry Danvers, John Sturgion and others.
A Complaint of the Oppressed, 1661.
The Unlawfulness of Mixed Marriages, 1681.
The Case of Mr. John Griffith, 1683. On the prosecution of that year of Griffith and Francis Bampfield for refusing the oath of allegiance.

Posthumous was
Two Discourses, 1707, revised by J. Jenkins.

Notes

Attribution

1622 births
1700 deaths
Arminian ministers
Arminian writers
English Baptists